Mason Nunatak is a nunatak, which is the summit or ridge of a mountain that protrudes from an ice field or glacier that otherwise covers most of the mountain or ridge.

Mason Nunatuk was named after Brian Harold Mason of the Department of Mineral Sciences, Smithsonian Institution, Washington, D.C.  Mason examined and classified meteorites collected by United States Antarctic Program field parties directed by William A. Cassidy in seven austral summers (i.e. summers of the southern hemisphere), 1977–78 through 1983–84.

References

Nunataks of Oates Land